Paul Wolff is a screenwriter, actor, producer.  He was a screenwriting teacher at the University of Southern California School of Cinematic Arts.  He retired in 2016 after teaching at the university for over twenty years.  Wolff previously had a career in television which spanned nearly three decades.

Career

Writer and actor
Wolff was a writer in the late 1970s on the TV series, Family.  He later wrote for such TV shows as Little House on the Prairie, Family Ties; Fame; Remington Steele (starring Pierce Brosnan); and Home Improvement.  Wolff also worked as a television producer and showrunner.  He created, produced, and acted as show runner on the short-lived series, Annie McGuire, starring Mary Tyler Moore.  He served as a producer and director on the early 1990s series Life Goes On.

In 2007, Wolff played the role of Prospero from Shakespeare's, The Tempest, at the Egyptian Arena Theatre's Shakespeare Festival.

Wolff co-wrote and starred in the comedy film, Father vs. Son, which co-stars Emmy winner Eric Stonestreet. The film won the Critics Choice Award for Best Premiere Film at the Houston International Film Festival and was acquired by Osiris Releasing.

Other Endeavors
Wolff taught a variety of screenwriting courses at the University of Southern California.  He was one of the founders of the Unica Film Collaborative, an experimental film group that focuses on the process of filmmaking, rather than the product.  Unica's first feature film, Blue in Green, was chosen by Los Angeles Times film critic Kevin Thomas to screen at the LA Cinematheque's Alternative Film Festival.

Professor Wolff was ordained as a Maggid, or Jewish teacher-storyteller, in 1994 by Rabbis Jonathan Omer-man and Zalman Schachter-Shalomi.  He served as spiritual leader at Beit T'Shuvah, a Jewish halfway house, for two years.  In 1994 he was recommended by Schachter-Shalomi to the Los Angeles Jewish Home to help the extreme aged find hope and purpose in the latter stages of life.  His "Meaning of Life" group is now in its 21st year.    In Over the Top Judaism (University Press of America, 2003), Elliot Gertel wrote that Wolff's "The Craftsman" episode of TV's Little House on the Prairie was "Television's best exploration of Judaism."

Awards
In 2013, Wolff received an award from the Writers Guild of America for his contribution to the TV show Family Ties, which was named as one of the Guild's "Best 101 Written Television Shows."

References

Year of birth missing (living people)
Living people
American television writers
American male television writers
American male television actors
Screenwriters from California